Eucalyptus exilis, commonly known as Boyagin mallee, is a species of mallee that is endemic to Western Australia. It has thin stems with smooth bark, lance-shaped adult leaves, flower buds in groups of eleven, white flowers and barrel-shaped to shortened spherical fruit.

Description
The trunk and branches have a covering of smooth, whitish to pale grey over yellow bark that is shed in long thin ribbons.

Flowering occurs between August and October and the flowers are white.

Taxonomy
Eucalyptus exilis was first formally described by Ian Brooker and published in the journal Nuytsia. The specific epithet is taken from the Latin word exilis meaning slender in reference to the stems.

Distribution
Boyagin mallee has a disjunct distribution in the wheatbelt region of Western Australia where it grows in heathland and shrubland on lateritic ridges in sandy loamy soils. The three main populations are found near Boyagin Rock, around Bindoon and north east of Mount Lesueur.

Conservation status
This eucalypt is classified as "not threatened" by the Western Australian Government Department of Parks and Wildlife.

See also
List of Eucalyptus species

References

Eucalypts of Western Australia
exilis
Myrtales of Australia
Plants described in 1974
Taxa named by Ian Brooker